Grodekovo is a rural locality (a selo) and the administrative center of Grodekovsky Selsoviet of Blagoveshchensky District, Amur Oblast, Russia. The population was 523 as of 2018. There are 10 streets.

Geography 
Grodekovo is located on the left bank of the Amur River, 36 km south of Blagoveshchensk (the district's administrative centre) by road. Nikolayevka is the nearest rural locality.

References 

Rural localities in Blagoveshchensky District, Amur Oblast